Ambaturai is a village that falls between road connecting Dindigul and Kodaikanal cities. The railway station by the same name at this place serves as the alighting place for the town of Chinnalapatti and the Gandhigram Rural Institute.

Villages in Dindigul district